The 2022–23 Houston Rockets season is the 56th season of the franchise in the National Basketball Association (NBA), and 52nd season in the city of Houston.

The team selected Jabari Smith Jr. at third overall, looking to improve on last season's record of 20–62.

With their 118-96 loss to the Brooklyn Nets on March 7, 2023, the Houston Rockets were officially eliminated from playoff contention.

Draft

The Rockets entered the draft holding two first round picks. The 17th overall pick came from the Brooklyn Nets in the James Harden trade.

On draft night, Houston traded Wendell Moore's draft rights at 26th to the Minnesota Timberwolves in exchange for the draft rights to TyTy Washington at 29th, in addition to two future second-round picks—2025 and 2027.

Roster

Standings

Division

Conference

Game log

Preseason 

|- style="background:#cfc;"
| 1
| October 2
| San Antonio
| 
| Smith Jr., Eason (21)
| Tari Eason (10)
| Kevin Porter Jr. (6)
| Toyota Center10,640
| 1–0
|-style="background:#cfc;
| 2
| October 7
| Toronto
| 
| Tari Eason (24)
| Bruno Fernando (10)
| Martin Jr., Nix, Christopher (3)
| Toyota Center10,902
| 2–0
|-style="background:#fcc;
| 3
| October 10
| @ Miami
| 
| Jalen Green (25)
| Tari Eason (12)
| Kevin Porter Jr. (6)
| FTX Arena19,600
| 2–1
|-style="background:#cfc;
| 4
| October 14
| @ Indiana
| 
| Jalen Green (33)
| Usman Garuba (9)
| Alperen Şengün (5)
| Gainbridge Fieldhouse7,107
| 3–1

Regular season

|-style="background:#fcc;
| 1
| October 19
| @ Atlanta
| 
| Kevin Porter Jr. (21)
| Fernando, Şengün (9)
| Fernando, Porter Jr. (7)
| State Farm Arena17,878
| 0–1
|-style="background:#fcc;
| 2
| October 21
| Memphis
| 
| Jalen Green (33)
| Alperen Şengün (12)
| Gordon, Porter Jr. (4)
| Toyota Center17,878
| 0–2
|-style="background:#fcc;"
| 3
| October 22
| @ Milwaukee
| 
| Jalen Green (22)
| Jabari Smith Jr. (11)
| Kevin Porter Jr. (7)
| Fiserv Forum17,341
| 0–3
|-style="background:#cfc;
| 4
| October 24
| Utah
| 
| Kevin Porter Jr. (26)
| Kevin Porter Jr. (10)
| Kevin Porter Jr. (4)
| Toyota Center16,260
| 1–3
|-style="background:#fcc;
| 5
| October 26
| @ Utah
| 
| Kevin Porter Jr. (24)
| Kenyon Martin Jr. (10)
| Kevin Porter Jr. (5)
| Vivint Arena18,206
| 1–4
|-style="background:#fcc;
| 6
| October 28
| @ Portland
| 
| Eric Gordon (18)
| Alperen Şengün (11)
| Jae'Sean Tate (6)
| Moda Center19,082
| 1–5
|- style="background:#fcc;"
| 7
| October 30
| @ Phoenix
| 
| Kevin Porter Jr. (26)
| Alperen Şengün (9)
| Kevin Porter Jr. (6)
| Footprint Center17,071
| 1–6
|- style="background:#fcc;"
| 8
| October 31
| @ L.A. Clippers
| 
| Kenyon Martin Jr. (23)
| Alperen Şengün (9)
| Kevin Porter Jr. (5)
| Crypto.com Arena14,887
| 1–7

|- style="background:#fcc;"
| 9
| November 2
| L.A. Clippers
| 
| Alperen Şengün (26)
| Alperen Şengün (13)
| Kevin Porter Jr. (7)
| Toyota Center15,860
| 1–8
|- style="background:#fcc;
| 10
| November 5
| @ Minnesota
| 
| Jalen Green (21)
| Alperen Şengün (7)
| Daishen Nix (6)
| Target Center16,412
| 1–9
|- style="background:#cfc;"
| 11
| November 7
| @ Orlando
| 
| Jalen Green (34)
| Alperen Şengün (10)
| Kevin Porter Jr. (11)
| Amway Center15,441
| 2–9
|- style="background:#fcc;
| 12
| November 9
| @ Toronto
| 
| Jalen Green (21)
| Jabari Smith Jr. (10)
| Kevin Porter Jr. (11)
| Scotiabank Arena19,800
| 2–10
|- style="background:#fcc;
| 13
| November 12
| @ New Orleans
| 
| Jalen Green (33)
| Jabari Smith Jr. (15)
| Jalen Green (6)
| Smoothie King Center15,367
| 2–11
|- style="background:#fcc;"
| 14
| November 14
| L.A. Clippers
| 
| Jalen Green (25)
| Kevin Porter Jr. (7)
| Jalen Green (7)
| Toyota Center16,098
| 2–12
|- style="background:#cfc;"
| 15
| November 16
| @ Dallas
| 
| Green, Porter Jr. (17)
| Kevin Porter Jr. (11)
| Kevin Porter Jr. (8)
| American Airlines Center19,602
| 3–12
|- style="background:#fcc;"
| 16
| November 18
| Indiana
| 
| Eric Gordon (24)
| Alperen Şengün (9)
| Jalen Green (5)
| Toyota Center15,882
| 3–13
|- style="background:#fcc;"
| 17
| November 20
| Golden State
| 
| Kevin Porter Jr. (30)
| Tari Eason (8)
| Kevin Porter Jr. (6)
| Toyota Center18,055
| 3–14
|-style="background:#cfc;"
| 18
| November 25
| Atlanta
| 
| Jalen Green (30)
| Kenyon Martin Jr. (15)
| Kevin Porter Jr. (10)
| Toyota Center16,669
| 4–14
|-style="background:#cfc;"
| 19
| November 26
| Oklahoma City
| 
| Jalen Green (28)
| Alperen Şengün (19)
| Jalen Green (9)
| Toyota Center15,151
| 5–14
|-style="background:#fcc;"
| 20
| November 28
| @ Denver
| 
| Alperen Şengün (18)
| Alperen Şengün (7)
| Jalen Green (7)
| Ball Arena16,027
| 5–15
|-style="background:#fcc;"
| 21
| November 30
| @ Denver
| 
| Kevin Porter Jr. (23)
| Alperen Şengün (11)
| Kevin Porter Jr. (5)
| Ball Arena16,286
| 5–16

|-style="background:#cfc;"
| 22
| December 2
| @ Phoenix
| 
| Jalen Green (30)
| Bruno Fernando (7)
| Kevin Porter Jr. (7)
| Footprint Center17,071
| 6–16
|-style="background:#fcc;"
| 23
| December 3
| @ Golden State
| 
| Kevin Porter Jr. (20)
| Eason, Garuba (10)
| Nix, Porter Jr. (4)
| Chase Center18,064
| 6–17
|-style="background:#cfc;"
| 24
| December 5
| Philadelphia
| 
| Jalen Green (27)
| Jabari Smith Jr. (11)
| Jalen Green (7)
| Toyota Center15,331
| 7–17
|-style="background:#fcc;"
| 25
| December 8
| @ San Antonio
| 
| Jabari Smith Jr. (23)
| Alperen Şengün (11)
| Daishen Nix (5)
| AT&T Center13,140
| 7–18
|-style="background:#cfc;"
| 26
| December 11
| Milwaukee
| 
| Jalen Green (30)
| Jabari Smith Jr. (10)
| Kevin Porter Jr. (7)
| Toyota Center16,268
| 8–18
|-style="background:#cfc;"
| 27
| December 13
| Phoenix
| 
| Jalen Green (26)
| Alperen Şengün (16)
| Green, Porter Jr. (4)
| Toyota Center15,128
| 9–18
|-style="background:#fcc;"
| 28
| December 15
| Miami
| 
| Jalen Green (22)
| Jabari Smith Jr. (11)
| Porter Jr., Washington Jr. (5)
| Toyota Center16,210
| 9–19
|-style="background:#fcc;"
| 29
| December 17
| Portland
| 
| Jalen Green (15)
| Alperen Şengün (8)
| Green, Porter Jr. (4)
| Toyota Center16,217
| 9–20
|-style="background:#fcc;"
| 30
| December 19
| San Antonio
| 
| Alperen Şengün (22)
| Jabari Smith Jr. (8)
| Daishen Nix (9)
| Toyota Center15,928
| 9–21
|-style="background:#fcc;"
| 31
| December 21
| Orlando
| 
| Kevin Porter Jr. (31)
| Alperen Şengün (12)
| Alperen Şengün (6)
| Toyota Center15,965
| 9–22
|-style="background:#fcc;"
| 32
| December 23
| Dallas
| 
| Jabari Smith Jr. (24)
| Jabari Smith Jr. (10)
| Alperen Şengün (7)
| Toyota Center16,989
| 9–23
|-style="background:#cfc;"
| 33
| December 26
| @ Chicago
| 
| Kevin Porter Jr. (36)
| Alperen Şengün (11)
| Kevin Porter Jr. (9)
| United Center21,561
| 10–23
|-style="background:#fcc;"
| 34
| December 27
| @ Boston
| 
| Jalen Green (28)
| Şengün, Smith Jr. (9)
| Kevin Porter Jr. (9)
| TD Garden19,156
| 10–24
|-style="background:#fcc;"
| 35
| December 29
| @ Dallas
| 
| Jalen Green (23)
| Usman Garuba (9)
| Kevin Porter Jr. (7)
| American Airlines Center20,307
| 10–25
|-style="background:#fcc;"
| 36
| December 31
| New York
| 
| Kevin Porter Jr. (23)
| Tari Eason (13)
| Kevin Porter Jr. (8)
| Toyota Center18,055
| 10–26

|-style="background:#fcc;"
| 37
| January 2
| Dallas
| 
| Kevin Porter Jr. (25)
| Tari Eason (7)
| Kevin Porter Jr. (6)
| Toyota Center18,055
| 10–27
|-style="background:#fcc;"
| 38
| January 4
| @ New Orleans
| 
| Green, Martin Jr. (16)
| Jabari Smith Jr. (13)
| Porter Jr, Şengün (5)
| Smoothie King Center17,295
| 10–28
|-style="background:#fcc;"
| 39
| January 5
| Utah
| 
| Jalen Green (30)
| Alperen Şengün (14)
| Jalen Green (4)
| Toyota Center16,320
| 10–29
|-style="background:#fcc;"
| 40
| January 8
| Minnesota
| 
| Kevin Porter Jr. (25)
| Alperen Şengün (8)
| Green, Porter Jr. (5)
| Toyota Center18,055
| 10–30
|-style="background:#fcc;"
| 41
| January 11
| @ Sacramento
| 
| Jalen Green (26)
| Alperen Şengün (10)
| Alperen Şengün (10)
| Golden 1 Center16,057
| 10–31
|-style="background:#fcc;" 
| 42
| January 13
| @ Sacramento
| 
| Green, Smith Jr. (27)
| Jabari Smith Jr. (8)
| Alperen Şengün (7)
| Golden 1 Center17,894
| 10–32
|-style="background:#fcc;"
| 43
| January 15
| @ L.A. Clippers
| 
| Eric Gordon (24)
| Kenyon Martin Jr. (9)
| Alperen Şengün (6)
| Crypto.com Arena17,238
| 10–33
|-style="background:#fcc;"
| 44
| January 16
| @ L.A. Lakers
|  
| Alperen Şengün (33)
| Alperen Şengün (15)
| Eric Gordon (8) 
| Crypto.com Arena17,657
| 10–34 
|- style="background:#fcc;"
| 45
| January 18
| Charlotte
|   
| Jalen Green (41)
| Alperen Şengün (12) 
| Jalen Green (7) 
| Toyota Center15,678
| 10–35
|-style="background:#fcc;"
| 46
| January 21
| @ Minnesota
|   
| Alperen Şengün (19) 
| Alperen Şengün (16)  
| Alperen Şengün (7)  
| Target Center17,136
| 10–36
|-style="background:#cfc;"
| 47
| January 23
| Minnesota
|    
| Jalen Green (42)
| Tari Eason (9)
| Alperen Şengün (7)  
| Toyota Center13,811
| 11–36
|-style="background:#fcc;"
| 48
| January 25
| Washington
| 
| Alperen Şengün (21)   
| Kenyon Martin Jr. (13) 
| Alperen Şengün (10)   
| Toyota Center15,302
| 11–37 
|-style="background:#fcc;"
| 49
| January 26
| Cleveland
|  
| Tari Eason (18)
| Tari Eason (11) 
| Alperen Şengün (7) 
| Toyota Center16,327
| 11–38 
|-style="background:#cfc;"
| 50
| January 28
| @ Detroit
|   
| Eric Gordon (24)
| Kenyon Martin Jr. (13)
| Eric Gordon (7) 
| Little Caesars Arena19,411
| 12–38
|-

|-style="background:#cfc;"
| 51
| February 1
| Oklahoma City
|   
| Eric Gordon (25)
| Tari Eason (13)
| Martin Jr., Şengün (4) 
| Toyota Center15,181
| 13–38
|-style="background:#fcc;"
| 52
| February 3
| Toronto
|   
| Eric Gordon (28)
| Jabari Smith Jr. (8)
| Gordon, Nix (5) 
| Toyota Center16,585
| 13–39
|-style="background:#fcc;"
| 53
| February 4
| @ Oklahoma City
|  
| Christopher, Washington Jr. (20)
| Tari Eason (8)
| Christoper, Nix (5)
| Paycom Center16,994
| 13–40
|-style="background:#fcc;"
| 54
| February 6
| Sacramento
|  
| Jalen Green (27)
| Kenyon Martin Jr. (8)
| Eric Gordon (8)
| Toyota Center15,405
| 13–41
|-style="background:#fcc;"
| 55
| February 8
| Sacramento
|  
| Jalen Green (41)
| Bruno Fernando (10)
| Alperen Şengün (11)
| Toyota Center15,881
| 13–42
|-style="background:#fcc;"
| 56
| February 10
| @ Miami
|  
| Jabari Smith Jr. (22)
| Şengün, Smith Jr. (8)
| TyTy Washington Jr. (6)
| Miami-Dade Arena
| 13–43
|-style="background:#fcc;"
| 57
| February 13
| @ Philadelphia
|  
| Jalen Green (29)
| Jabari Smith Jr. (12)
| Jalen Green (4)
| Wells Fargo Center19,850
| 13–44
|-style="background:#fcc;"
| 58
| February 15
| @ Oklahoma City
|  
| Jabari Smith Jr. (15)
| Alperen Şengün (10)
| Frank Kaminsky (5)
| Paycom Center14,988
| 13–45
|-style="background:#fcc;"
| 59
| February 24
| @ Golden State
| 
| Kenyon Martin Jr. (22)
| Şengün, Smith Jr. (9)
| Alperen Şengün (8)
| Chase Center18,064
| 13–46
|-style="background:#fcc;"
| 60
| February 26
| @ Portland
| 
| Şengün, Tate (17)
| Eason, Şengün (10)
| Alperen Şengün (5)
| Moda Center18,064
| 13–47
|-style="background:#fcc;"
| 61
| February 28
| Denver
| 
| Eason, Green (17)
| Tari Eason (12)
| Alperen Şengün (8)
| Toyota Center15,368
| 13–48
|-

|-style="background:#fcc;"
| 62
| March 1
| Memphis
| 
| Jalen Green (20)
| Alperen Şengün (8)
| Alperen Şengün (5)
| Toyota Center15,919
| 13–49
|-style="background:#cfc;"
| 63
| March 4
| @ San Antonio
| 
| Tari Eason (20)
| Kenyon Martin Jr. (13)
| Kevin Porter Jr. (5)
| AT&T Center18,354
| 14–49
|-style="background:#cfc;"
| 64
| March 5
| San Antonio
| 
| Jalen Green (31)
| Alperen Şengün (14)
| Kevin Porter Jr. (13)
| Toyota Center16,721
| 15–49
|-style="background:#fcc;"
| 65
| March 7
| Brooklyn
| 
| Jalen Green (25)
| Alperen Şengün (12)
| Kevin Porter Jr. (7)
| Toyota Center14,833
| 15–50
|-style="background:#fcc;"
| 66
| March 9
| @ Indiana
| 
| Jabari Smith Jr. (30)
| Jabari Smith Jr. (12)
| Jalen Green (4)
| Gainbridge Fieldhouse16,027
| 15–51
|-style="background:#fcc;"
| 67
| March 11
| Chicago
| 
| Jabari Smith Jr. (20)
| Jabari Smith Jr. (10)
| Jalen Green (7)
| Toyota Center18,055
| 15–52
|-style="background:#cfc;"
| 68
| March 13
| Boston
| 
| Jalen Green (28)
| Jabari Smith Jr. (11)
| Kevin Porter Jr. (13)
| Toyota Center18,055
| 16–52
|-style="background:#cfc;"
| 69
| March 15
| L.A. Lakers
| 
| Kevin Porter Jr. (27)
| Porter Jr., Şengün (9)
| Porter Jr., Şengün (6)
| Toyota Center18,055
| 17–52
|-style="background:#cfc;"
| 70
| March 17
| New Orleans
| 
| Jalen Green (25)
| Alperen Şengün (11)
| Green, Porter Jr. (6)
| Toyota Center15,841
| 18–52
|-style="background:#fcc;"
| 71
| March 19
| New Orleans
| 
| Jalen Green (40)
| Alperen Şengün (7)
| Alperen Şengün (6) 
| Toyota Center14,209
| 18–53
|-
| 72
| March 20
| Golden State
|  
| 
|  
|  
| Toyota Center
| 
|-
| 73
| March 22
| @ Memphis
|  
| 
|  
|  
| FedExForum
| 
|-
| 74
| March 24
| @ Memphis
|  
| 
|  
|  
| FedExForum
| 
|-
| 75
| March 26
| @ Cleveland
|  
| 
|  
|  
| Rocket Mortgage FieldHouse
| 
|-
| 76
| March 27
| @ New York
|  
| 
|  
|  
| Madison Square Garden
| 
|-
| 77
| March 29
| @ Brooklyn
|  
| 
|  
|  
| Barclays Center
| 
|-
| 78
| March 31
| Detroit
|  
| 
|  
|  
| Toyota Center
| 
|-

Transactions

Overview

Trades

Free agency

Re-signed

Additions

Subtractions

References

Houston Rockets seasons
Houston Rockets
Houston Rockets
Houston Rockets